A Decade of Hits is a compilation album by The Charlie Daniels Band released on June 20, 1983. There were three new songs for the album, "Stroker's Theme (Theme from the movie, "Stroker Ace"), which was released as a single, "Let It Roll" and "Everytime I See Him".

Track listing

Personnel

Charlie Daniels – guitar, violin, vocals, producer
Tom Crain – guitar, vocals
"Taz" DiGregorio – keyboards, vocals
Fred Edwards – drums
Charlie Hayward – bass
Chris Athens – mastering
John Boylan – producer
Larry Dixon – photography
Bill Flannery – photography
Paul Grupp – engineer

Chart performance

Weekly charts

Year-end charts

Singles

Certifications

References

Charlie Daniels albums
1983 compilation albums
Epic Records compilation albums